Perry Wendell Hill  (born March 19, 1952) is an American professional baseball coach. He is the infield coach for the Seattle Mariners of Major League Baseball (MLB). He formerly coached for the Texas Rangers, Detroit Tigers, Montreal Expos, Florida / Miami Marlins, and Pittsburgh Pirates.

Career
Hill was an infielder in college, Pan American University, and six seasons in the Mexican League.

Hill began his coaching career with the Rangers' Class A team in 1984.  He rose through the organization until he became the Rangers infield and first base coach from 1992 through 1995. He spent three years with Detroit from 1997 through 1999, which became the first major-league club to go from worst to first in fielding percentage. He spent 2000–01 with the Montreal Expos and coached the Florida Marlins from 2002 through 2007.  He returned to coaching in 2009, when he coached the Pittsburgh Pirates. Hill was rehired by the Marlins to coach first base for the 2011 season. He was not retained by the Marlins after the 2018 season. Hill was hired by the Seattle Mariners as their first base and infield coach prior to the 2019 season.

References

External links

1952 births
Living people
American expatriate baseball people in Canada
Baseball coaches from Kansas
Baseball players from Kansas
Detroit Tigers coaches
Major League Baseball first base coaches
Major League Baseball third base coaches
Miami Marlins coaches
Minor league baseball coaches
Montreal Expos coaches
Paris Junior College alumni
Pittsburgh Pirates coaches
Rio Grande Valley WhiteWings players
Seattle Mariners coaches
Sportspeople from Salina, Kansas
Texas Rangers coaches
UT Rio Grande Valley Vaqueros baseball players